Jean Daive (born 13 May 1941) is a French poet and translator. He is the author of novels, collections of poetry and has translated work by Paul Celan and Robert Creeley among others.

He has edited encyclopedias, worked as a radio journalist and producer with France Culture, and has edited three magazines: fragment (1970–73), fig. (1989–91), and FIN (1999–2006). His first book, Décimale blanche (Mercure de France, 1967) was translated into German by Paul Celan, and into English by Cid Corman.

Life and work 
Jean Daive was born in Bon-Secours, a section of the city of Péruwelz located in Wallonia, a predominantly French speaking southern region of Belgium and part of the province of Hainaut. Having been an encyclopedist for seventeen years, he worked on various radio programs for France Culture from 1975 until 2009.

Publishing since the 1960s and today known as one of the important French avant-garde poets,  Daive's work is an investigation alternating between poetry, narration and reflective prose. He has published several interrelated volumes, including a sequence with the general title Narration d'équilibre (1982–90) and the prose series, La Condition d'infini (1995-97: 7 volumes, of which Under the Dome: Walks with Paul Celan, published in English in 2009, is volume 5).

According to Peter France, Daive's tense, elliptical poems explore the difficulties of existence in an enigmatic world.

Also a photographer, Daive chairs the Centre international de poésie de Marseille.

Publications

In English
White Decimal (tr. C. Corman), Origin, 1969
A Lesson in Music (tr. Julie Kalendek), Providence, RI: Burning Deck, 1992
 Anne-Marie Albiach, A Discursive, Space: Interviews with Jean Daive tr. Norma Cole. (Duration Press, 1999).
Under The Dome: Walks with Paul Celan (tr. Rosmarie Waldrop), Providence, RI: Burning Deck, 2009.
Work has appeared in Auster, Paul, editor, The Random House Book of Twentieth-Century French Poetry: with Translations by American and British Poets, New York: Random House, 1982 
Work has also appeared in magazines including "Modern Poetry in Translation", "Avec", "New Directions 44", "Serie d’Ecriture 3".
Under the Dome: Walks with Paul Celan (tr. Rosmarie Waldrop), (City Lights Publishers, 2020) .

Poetry
 Décimale Blanche (1967)
 Fut Bâti (1973)
 L'Absolu reptilien (1975)
 N, M, U (1975)
 Le Cri-cerveau (1977)
 Narration d'équilibre 1 : Antériorité du scandale, 2 : « Sllt », 3 : Vingt-quatre images seconde (1982)
 Un transitif (1984)
 Narration d'équilibre 4 : W (1985)
 Narration d'équilibre 5 : America domino (1987)
 Narration d'équilibre 6 : Alphabet, 7 : Une Leçon de musique, 8 : Grammaire, 9 : Suivez l'enfant (1990),
 Trilogie du temps 1 : Objet bougé (1999)
 Trilogie du temps 2 : Le Retour passeur (2000)
 Trilogie du temps 3 : Les Axes de la terre (2001)
 Une Femme de quelques vies (2009)
Novels and récits
 Le Jeu des séries scéniques (1975)
 1, 2, de la série non aperçue (1975)
 La Condition d'infini 1 : Un Trouble (1995)
 La Condition d'infini 2 : Le Jardin d'hiver, 3 : La Maison des blocs tombés, 4 : Le Mur d'or (1995)
 La Condition d'infini 5 : Sous la coupole (1996)
 L'Autoportrait aux dormeuses (2000)
 Le Grand Incendie de l'Homme (2007)

Other texts
 Tapiès répliquer (1981)
 Si la neige devenait plus blanche(1985), avec Jean-Michel Alberola
 Propositions d'été induites par des énoncés d'hiver (1989)
Translations
 Paul Celan, Strette & autres poèmes (1970)
 Robert Creeley, La Fin (1997)
 Johannes Poethen, L'Espace d'un jeu (1998)
Interviews
 Anne-Marie Albiach, L'exact réel (2006)

References

Further reading
 « Dossier Jean Daive », Cahier critique de poésie, n° 14, novembre 2007.
 Hamacher, Werner, Anataxe. Virgule. Balance — Notes pour W de Jean Daive, trad. de l'allemand par Michèle Cohen-Halimi (2009).

External links
  La bio-bibliographie de Daive sur le site des éditions POL Biography and bibliography at a publisher's website
 Walks with Paul Celan: a review by American poet Robert Archambeau
 Luminous Wounds John Sheen reviews Walks with Paul Celan

1941 births
Living people
People from Péruwelz
Belgian male poets
Belgian poets in French
Belgian translators
20th-century Belgian novelists
21st-century Belgian novelists
Belgian male novelists
Belgian male short story writers
Belgian short story writers
20th-century Belgian poets
21st-century Belgian poets
20th-century short story writers
21st-century short story writers
20th-century Belgian male writers
21st-century Belgian male writers